Tomoxia formosana is a species of beetle in the genus Tomoxia of the family Mordellidae. It was described by Chûjô in 1935.

References

Beetles described in 1935
Tomoxia